Casa Navàs is a  modernist building in the city of Reus, Catalonia, Spain. Casa Navàs is a building designed by Catalan architect Lluís Domènech i Montaner, located in the city's Plaça del Mercadal.

Joaquim Navàs Padró of Reus contracted Lluís Domènech i Muntaner as the architect of his new house. The building was constructed from 1901 to 1908.

 
The building had a tower on the left facade, but it was destroyed by bombing by Nationalist forces during the Spanish Civil War and never rebuilt. Inside the building is a very wide and brightly lit space.  Marble works were done by Alfons Juyol i Bach, the paintings by Tomàs Bergadà, the furniture by Gaspar Homar and the ceramics by Hipòlit Montseny; all of them under the instructions of Lluís Domènech i Montaner.

Nowadays the building is still the same as it was originally (except the tower), and that includes the furniture, the ceramics, mosaics, lights, etc.

Modernisme architecture in Reus
Buildings and structures in Reus
Lluís Domènech i Montaner buildings
Houses completed in 1908
Art Nouveau houses
Houses in Catalonia
1908 establishments in Spain
Visionary environments